The Algerian Women's Championship known as Elite National Championship is the top flight of women's association football in Algeria. It is the women's equivalent of the Ligue 1, but is not professional. The competition is run by the Ligue Nationale du Football Féminin under the auspices of the Algerian Football Federation.

History

In the 1970s, many women's football clubs were formed in Algeria as in Tiaret in 1975 but they only took part in friendly tournaments only. Since 1990, other clubs began to appear.

The first Algerian women's championship was contested in 1998–1999 season under the regional leagues format. In the 2008–09 season, a national league of two divisions was created (D1 and D2) under the auspices of the Ligue Nationale du Football (LNF). In 2013, was created the Ligue du football féminin (LFF) which was the body of national championships.

The competition changed its name to Elite National Championship from the 2021–22 season.

Format
The teams play a double round-robin. The season usually starts in October and lasts until June.

Champions
The list of champions and runners-up:

Most successful clubs

See also
 Algerian Women's Cup
 Algerian Women's League Cup
 Algerian Women's Super Cup

References

External links 
 Ligue du Football Féminin
 Algerian Football Federation
 Algeria (Women), List of Champions - rsssf.com

 
Women's association football leagues in Africa
Women's football competitions in Algeria
Women
1998 establishments in Algeria
Sports leagues established in 1998
Football